Ouro Branco is a municipality in the state of Alagoas in the Northeast region of Brazil.

See also
List of municipalities in Alagoas

References

Municipalities in Alagoas